Ichthyophis nguyenorum is a species of caecilian in the family Ichthyophiidae. They were first found in Kon Plông District, Kon Tum Province, central Vietnam, in 2006, and formally described in 2012. The species is now also known from the Cat Tien National Park in Đồng Nai and Lâm Đồng provinces, southern Vietnam, and is presumed to occur more widely in suitable habitat in central and southern Vietnam as well as in eastern Cambodia.

Etymology
The specific name I. nguyenorum honours two Vietnamese herpetologists, Nguyen Quang Truong and Nguyen Thien Tao, who are brothers. The common name Nguyen's caecilian (Ếch giun Nguyễn - literally "worm frog" in Vietnamese) has been coined for this species.

Description
The type series consists of three adult females that measure  in total length. The body is cylindrical and slightly depressed dorsoventrally. The eyes are slightly protruding. The tentacles are very close to the edge of the mouth. The head is slightly widened around the jaw angle and narrows anteriorly. The body has 312–318 annuli in total. The annular grooves are dorsally complete but narrowly separate ventrally, except for the last one tenth of body. The body color is uniform slate dorsally and paler, lilac ventrally. A broad and uninterrupted bright yellow lateral stripe runs throughout the body.

Habitat and conservation
The type specimens were collected on the floor of a secondary forest near a farmland, after heavy rain. The larvae live in streams.

Habitat loss and degradation is common within the range of this species, but its sensitivity to forest loss is unknown. It is known to be present in one national park, and its likely range includes several other protected areas.

References

External links
 Phát hiện một loài ếch giun mới ở Tây Nguyên, Việt Nam Phùng Mỹ Trung, SVRVN, 2012
 Ichthyophis nguyenorum

nguyenorum
Endemic fauna of Vietnam
Amphibians of Vietnam
Amphibians described in 2012